The Peace of Caltabellotta, signed on 31 August 1302, was the last of a series of treaties, including those of Tarascon and Anagni, designed to end the conflict between the Houses of Anjou and Barcelona for ascendancy in the Mediterranean and especially Sicily and the Mezzogiorno.

The peace divided the old Kingdom of Sicily into an island portion and a peninsular portion. The island, called the Kingdom of Trinacria, went to Frederick III, who had been ruling it; the Mezzogiorno, called the Kingdom of Sicily contemporaneously, but called the Kingdom of Naples by modern scholarship, went to Charles II, who had been ruling it. Thus, the peace was formal recognition of an uneasy status quo.

The treaty also stipulated that Trinacria would pass to the Angevins on Frederick's death, but until then, Charles paid a tribute of 100,000 ounces of gold in exchange to Frederick. Immediately, in exchange, Frederick handed over all his possessions in Calabria and elsewhere on the mainland and released Charles' son Philip, Prince of Taranto, from his prison in Cefalù. As well, the marriage of Charles' daughter Eleanor to Frederick was arranged.

The consequences of this treaty meant that Roger de Flor and his Almogavars of the Catalan Company had to seek pay elsewhere. They took up service with the Byzantine emperor Andronicus II Palaeologus. One Bernat de Rocafort, an Almogàvar, did not want to return to Charles his two castles in Calabria until he was compensated with pay. He was captured and left to eventually die in an oubliette of Robert the Wise, Charles' successor, in 1309.

References

Sources

14th century in the Kingdom of Sicily
14th century in the Kingdom of Naples
1302 in Europe
Caltabellotta
Peace treaties of Italy
War of the Sicilian Vespers